Hradištko (until 1969 Hradišťko) is a municipality and village in Nymburk District in the Central Bohemian Region of the Czech Republic. It has about 800 inhabitants. It includes the hamlet of Kersko, which is known as home and inspiration of writer Bohumil Hrabal.

Notable people
Bohumil Hrabal (1914–1997), writer; lived, worked and is buried here

References

Villages in Nymburk District